The Calcaire de Valognes is an Early Jurassic (Hettangian) geologic formation in France. Dinosaur remains diagnostic to the genus level are among the fossils that have been recovered from the formation.

Paleofauna 
 Megalosaurus cf. cloacinus

See also 
 List of dinosaur-bearing rock formations
 List of stratigraphic units with few dinosaur genera

References

Bibliography 
 Weishampel, David B.; Dodson, Peter; and Osmólska, Halszka (eds.): The Dinosauria, 2nd, Berkeley: University of California Press. 861 pp. .

Geologic formations of France
Jurassic System of Europe
Jurassic France
Hettangian Stage
Limestone formations
Paleontology in France